was a Japanese pin-up model and aspiring actress for an agency in Tokyo, Japan. She was murdered by her 21-year-old brother  (born 1985) on December 30, 2006. Her death aroused the tabloids' notice for the circumstances surrounding the crime.

Life and career 
Muto's father and mother were both dentists and she was brought up in a relatively affluent environment, but she was rebellious against her parents and ran away from her home between December 2004 and May 2005. She filled the role of a supporting actor on an incest-themed V-Cinema adaptation of Cream Lemon. Her role was a woman who wore a blue commando uniform. After her death, the Tokyo District Public Prosecutor's Office denied Yuki's incestuous interest in Azumi, which some tabloids had suspected.

She also made her stage debut in 2006. Her final performance, as that of a nurse, took place on December 10, 2006. She apparently had told her friends that there were problems in the family regarding her brother's mental state a few days before the murder took place.

Death 
On December 30, 2006 in Tokyo, Yuki beat her with a wooden sword, and strangled her with a towel. She was finally drowned in a bath. He dismembered her body with a saw and a large knife. He was arrested on January 4, 2007. He hid the body parts in various places in his room in Hatagaya of Shibuya. Yuki sliced off his sister's breasts and genitals after he killed her. He put them through the garbage disposal in the sink. He said that it was in order to hide her gender after the police found the body. The Tokyo District Public Prosecutor's Office said that Yuki was not a necrophile nor a cannibal.

Yuki was bothered by his younger sister Azumi teasing him about being a failure and telling him that he had "no ambition" in life. It was apparently the talk of him having no ambition that prompted him to murder his sister. Yuki had failed repeatedly to pass college entrance exams. Prosecutors claim this pressure contributed to his psychotic stress. Later, the police were criticized for abandonment of his weapons.

On May 12, 2008, prosecutors requested 17 years imprisonment for Yuki, whereas his psychiatrist claimed that he had diminished responsibility or was criminally insane. On May 27, 2008, the Tokyo District Court sentenced him to 7 years imprisonment, saying that he was criminally insane when he dismembered her body. On April 28, 2009, however, the Tokyo High Court revoked his original sentence, sentencing him to 12 years.

Film 
くりいむレモン プールサイドの亜美, AMG entertainment, October 27, 2006

References

External links

Student's sister died violent death The Japan Times, January 6, 2007
Slaying suspect cites exam pressure The Japan Times, January 8, 2007
Man admits drowning, dismembering sister The Japan Times, August 1, 2007
Well-to-do family shattered by brutal murder of would-be starlet by psychotic sibling Mainichi Shimbun, January 12, 2007 (archived)

1986 births
2006 deaths
Deaths by drowning
Japanese actresses
Japanese murder victims
People murdered in Tokyo
People from Tokyo
Sororicides
Violence against women in Japan